A rescue craft is a boat, ship or aircraft used in rescuing.

The most common are lifeboats for inshore and closer-to-shore rescues, with helicopters and ships used farther out.

Most government agencies rely on larger ships for rescues further from shore such as Royal Navy ships in the United Kingdom and Coast Guard Cutters used in the USA. Similarly, the UK rescues use both Royal Air Force SAR and UK Coastguard personnel for helicopter rescues, and in the USA the United States Coast Guard is tapped.

History

Sea

There were attempts as early as the 14th century to aid shipwreck victims with the Chinese training in resuscitation for the drowning, as well as in Portugal and Sweden in the 1690s ordering that ships should be sent to sea to rescue shipwreck survivors, but the first mention of lifeboats was in China where boats were used to rescue people from the rivers in 1737.

Air

The development of the seaplane meant that aircraft could be used to rescue people but was limited as they could not land or take off in heavy seas.

Helicopters overcame this problem as they were able to hover over the victim and give aid by dropping a line to them with either a basket or diver to assist their extraction.

Modern rescue craft

Sea

Many types of boats and ships are used, ranging from 2 man inflatables, such as inflatable rescue boats, rigid inflatable boats, and larger, purpose-built vessels.

For offshore and far from coast rescues operations most countries rely on naval or coast guard ships for these operations.

For submarines which have got into difficulty there are highly-specialised rescue submarines and support ships such as the NATO NSRS and the USA's deep-submergence rescue vehicle.

Inland or shallow water

There are still smaller boats which may be used on inland waters such as lakes or estuaries where the waters are generally calmer and shallow. These boats are often hand powered.

References

Lifeboats